Spilomela is a genus of moths of the family Crambidae.

Species
Spilomela discordens Dyar, 1914
Spilomela divaricata (Hampson, 1899)
Spilomela minoralis Hampson, 1912
Spilomela pantheralis (Geyer in Hübner, 1832)
Spilomela personalis Herrich-Schäffer, 1871
Spilomela perspicata (Fabricius, 1787)
Spilomela pervialis Herrich-Schäffer, 1871
Spilomela receptalis (Walker, 1859)

References

Spilomelinae
Crambidae genera
Taxa named by Achille Guenée